King Kull (also known as the Beastman or the Beast Man) is a supervillain, created by Otto Binder and C.C. Beck. He originally appeared in Fawcett Comics in the early 1950s, before that company ceased publishing its superhero titles. DC Comics would later revive the character in the 1970s, where he now appears as a foe of Captain Marvel.

Publication history
Created by writer Otto Binder and artist C. C. Beck, King Kull's first appearance was in Captain Marvel Adventures #125 (cover-dated October 1951). King Kull appeared in adventures of Captain Marvel during the 1950s and the period in which DC Comics revived the hero during the 1970s.

Fictional character biography
In prehistoric times (according to one account around 28,000 BC), King Kull is ruler of the Submen (also called Beast-Men), a brutish but technologically advanced race that ruled humanity until they were overthrown in a revolt thousands of years ago, as the humans vastly outnumbered them and killed all the other Beast-Men. Kull fakes his death with a bomb and survives until the 20th century in suspended animation in a cavern, then awakens due to an earthquake and repeatedly threatens the human-dominated modern world with his immense strength, durability, and bizarre technology, which is in Captain Marvel's region. However, other versions claim he emerged throughout human history and attempted to stop the spread of democracy, and is apparently the basis for the Bogeyman and other mythical monsters.

He is usually thwarted by Captain Marvel or the Marvel Family. On one occasion, he collaborated with Doctor Sivana. On another occasion, he released the Seven Deadly Enemies of Man and using Sin bombs to try destroying the world. King Kull once tried to turn Billy to stone instead on one occasion.

One particularly well-planned escapade requires the efforts of the Justice League of America and the Justice Society of America (in one of their dimension-crossing team-ups, which DC produced annually from the mid-1960s to the mid-1980s), as well as a group of heroes of Captain Marvel and King Kull's home universe of Earth-S, referred to unofficially as Shazam's Squadron of Justice. All of these are required because Kull has captured both the wizard Shazam who grants the Marvel Family's powers and the ancient gods and goddesses the powers are drawn from after gaining access to the Rock of Eternity with a faster-than-light ship, paralyzing them with a device that slowed down their impulses, except for the swift Mercury who was able to get away in time; after Shazam makes telepathic communication with him he warns other heroes from the Three Earths about King Kull. Johnny Thunder's Thunderbolt helps the Marvels get their powers back in the final issue and transports them to the Rock of Eternity. Kull recruits the aid of villains from the three earths. First, he enlists Penguin of Earth-One, Queen Clea of Earth-Two, Blockbuster of Earth-One, and Ibac of Earth-S for his attack on Earth-Two, where he tries to wreck Atlantis and use a cloud to sink islands. They are thwarted by Superman of Earth-One, Wonder Woman of Earth-Two, Green Arrow of Earth-One, and Spy Smasher of Earth-S. For his attack on Earth-S, King Kull recruits Joker of Earth-Two, Weeper II of Earth-S, Doctor Light of Earth-One, and Shade of Earth-One, who trap one side of the world in light and another in darkness, and try to transform people into different materials. They are defeated by Batman and Robin of Earth-Two, Mr. Scarlet and Pinky the Whiz Kid of Earth-S, and Hawkman and Hawkgirl of Earth-One. For Earth-One, he recruits Mister Atom of Earth-S and Brainiac of Earth-One, who attack the City of Tomorrow, and increase the Earth's rotation to send people into the air. They are thwarted by Flash of Earth-One, Flash of Earth-Two, Green Lantern of Earth-One, Green Lantern of Earth-Two, Mercury of Earth-S, and Ibis the Invincible of Earth-S. He is trying to wipe out humanity on all three Earths so his people can rule once again. They are all defeated, and the heroes then head to the Rock of Eternity, with Superman leading the attack. Despite turning Superman against the other superheroes using a Red Kryptonite chunk which fills Superman's mind with rage and makes him invulnerable to Green Kryptonite, he is eventually defeated after Captain Marvel knocks him out, Jr. destroys the Red Kryptonite, Mary frees the Elders, and Captain Marvel uses his lightning to restore Superman's mind. King Kull was imprisoned with magic chains that supposedly even Hercules could not break, and the heroes returned to their own worlds.

King Kull has occasionally appeared as a member of the final Monster Society of Evil, and assisted in their assault on the Rock of Eternity with an army from 247 planets. The character has not appeared since Captain Marvel's history was rebooted by Crisis on Infinite Earths in 1985. He is sometimes confused with Kull, a barbarian hero and king created by Robert E. Howard, but Howard's Kull was an ancient human in a sword-and-sorcery setting rather than a protohuman with science-fiction technology.

King Kull made his first appearance in over 20 years in the fifth issue of the limited series Justice League: Cry For Justice. Here, he was shown battling Stargirl and Cyclone as part of a massive plot by Prometheus to distract Earth's superheroes so that he could plant massive teleportation devices in various cities.

In "DC Rebirth", King Kull came from the Earthlands and is a member of the Monster Society of Evil. He was among its members imprisoned in the Dungeon of Eternity within the Monsterlands until Mister Mind instructed Doctor Sivana on how to free them. As Shazam fights the Mister Mind-controlled C.C. Batson, King Kull states to the rest of the Monster Society of Evil to leave the women to him while Mister Merry-Go-Round states that he "gets the youngest to play with" which is what they agreed on. While mentioning that his kind used to rule the Earthlands, Mary tricks King Kull into attacking the three-headed Crocodile-Man. He manages to pin Mary down as Mister Mind provokes Shazam into reading a spell from the Book of Champions that unites the Seven Magiclands. King Kull continues his fight with Mary until magical energy emitted from Shazam defeating Mister Mind knocked him and the Monster Society of Evil out. The Monster Society of Evil was mentioned to have been remanded to Rock Falls Penitentiary where the Shazam Family built a special section to contain magical threats.

Powers and abilities
King Kull has enhanced strength, stamina, and durability. He possesses supergenius intelligence and is an expert at unarmed combat. Kull can even access to his advanced airship.

Related characters
Prior to King Kull, there have been some characters that had his traits:

A race of prehistoric men who have been frozen for thousands of years at the North Pole. They are apparently strong enough to survive a bazooka shell, super-intelligent, and explorer Rodney Stark has devised a method of bringing them back to life, planning to use them to build an air force, using copies of stolen U.S. planes, allowing him to take over the world. They are all destroyed in an explosion along with Stark when Captain Marvel makes their planes crash.

A similar-looking villain called the Beast-Ruler. He was created by the mad scientist Sivana with a humanoid body and animal qualities like a gorilla's strength, a serpent's speed, a tiger's fighting skills, a fox's cunning, a lion's bravery, and an elephant's memory after imbuing it with the lifeforce that was drawn from 1,000 animals. He turns against Sivana and tries to attack humanity with an animal army, hating man despite his similar appearance and planning to make animals rule. Captain Marvel leads an army of animals against his. He is finally thrown over a waterfall in a fight with Captain Marvel.

Kull, the God of Crime, also fought Captain Marvel. He resided in the Underworld and planned crimes against mankind. Apart from the name he had little in common.

Other versions
King Kull appears in Billy Batson and the Magic of Shazam! #6.

In other media
A character partially inspired by King Kull named Kru'll the Eternal appears in Batman: The Brave and the Bold, voiced by Michael Dorn. Following his introduction in the episode "Menace from the Conquering Caveman!", he joins the Monster Society of Evil in the episode "The Malicious Mr. Mind!".

References

DC Comics characters with superhuman strength
DC Comics supervillains
DC Comics fantasy characters
DC Comics male supervillains
Fawcett Comics supervillains
Golden Age supervillains
Comics characters introduced in 1951
Fictional characters with superhuman durability or invulnerability
Fictional prehistoric characters
Fictional warlords
Characters created by Otto Binder
Characters created by C. C. Beck
Captain Marvel (DC Comics)